"Sunchyme" is the debut single of British electronic music trio Dario G. It was released on 15 September 1997 as the lead single from their debut studio album, Sunmachine (1998), although early editions were stated to be from an album named Super Dario Land. The song heavily samples the track "Life in a Northern Town" by dream pop band the Dream Academy.

The song reached top-five positions in many European music charts. It also topped the US Billboard Dance Club Songs chart following its American release in May 1998. In the United Kingdom, the song peaked at number two on the UK Singles Chart whilst Elton John's "Candle in the Wind 1997" was at number one. This was the largest difference in sales between a number-one and number-two song on the chart.

The English football club F.C. Halifax Town plays the song before home games at The Shay.

Critical reception
Larry Flick from Billboard wrote, "Import enthusiasts are already well-aware of this spunky, Euro-splashed instrumental, which draws its hook from Dream Academy's 1985 hit 'Life In A Northern Town'. First heard several months ago on the U.K.'s Eternal Records, this track is already making the rounds on crossover radio stations and mix shows." He concluded with that it "has the juice to become a massive top 40 hit." A reviewer from Music Week gave "Sunchyme" four out of five, noting that "this catchy, uplifting house track is already attracting heavy airplay from Radio One and Capital, and is guaranteed to cross over into chartsuccess." The magazine's Alan Jones declared it as "a gem, with the potential to go to the very top." Tim Jeffery from the RM Dance Update rated the song five out of five, viewing it as "unashamed pop dance at its simplest and best". He added, "It'll have virtually everyone wincing and complaining that it's nothing to do with the "proper" dance scene while they observe entire clubs with their hands raised, belting out the chorus and generally going potty. Love it or loath it, you'll be hearing this from now until Christmas, and even beyond."

Music video
The accompanying music video for the song features a tribe of African people having their bodies covered with colourful paint to portray the animals of their native land (as well as tigers, which are not native to Africa). Later, they jump into a river to wash away the paint.

Track listings

 UK, US, and Australian CD single
 "Sunchyme" (radio edit) – 3:54
 "Sunchyme" (original) – 8:28
 "Chyme" – 3:39

 UK cassette single
 "Sunchyme" (radio edit) – 3:54
 "Chyme" – 3:39
 "Sunchyme" (The Boy Dunne Good edit) – 4:23

 UK 12-inch single
A. "Sunchyme" (original) – 8:28
AA. "Sunchyme" (remapped by Coloured Oxygen) – 12:28

 European CD single
 "Sunchyme" (radio edit) – 3:54
 "Sunchyme" (original) – 8:28

Charts

Weekly charts

Year-end charts

Certifications

See also
 List of number-one dance singles of 1998 (U.S.)

References

1997 songs
1997 debut singles
Dario G songs
Number-one singles in Hungary
Songs written by Nick Laird-Clowes